This is a list of fossiliferous stratigraphic units in Mali.



List of fossiliferous stratigraphic units

See also 
 Lists of fossiliferous stratigraphic units in Africa
 List of fossiliferous stratigraphic units in Guinea
 List of fossiliferous stratigraphic units in Ivory Coast
 List of fossiliferous stratigraphic units in Mauritania
 List of fossiliferous stratigraphic units in Niger
 List of fossiliferous stratigraphic units in Senegal
 Geology of Mali

References

Further reading 
 E. S. Gaffney, E. Roberts, F. Sissoko, M. L. Bouaré, L. Tapanila and M. A. O'Leary. 2007. Acleistochelys, a New Side-Necked Turtle (Pelomedusoides: Bothremydidae) from the Paleocene of Mali. American Museum Novitates 3549:1-24
 E. S. Gaffney, R. T. J. Moody, and C. A. Walker. 2001. Azabbaremys, a new Side-Necked Turtle (Pelomedusoides: Bothremydidae) from the Paleocene of Mali. American Museum Novitates 3320:1-16
 R. V. Hill, J. A. McCartney, E. Roberts, M. Bouaré, F. Sissoko and M. A. O'Leary. 2008. Dyrosaurid (Crocodyliformes: Mesoeucrocodylia) Fossils from the Upper Cretaceous and Paleogene of Mali: Implications for Phylogeny and Survivorship across the K/T Boundary. American Museum Novitates 3631:1-19
 A. F. d. Lapparent. 1960. Les Dinosauriens du "Continental intercalaire" du Saharal central [The dinosaurs of the "Continental Intercalaire" of the central Sahara]. Mémoires de la Société géologique de France, nouvelle série 39(88A):1-57
 M. A. O’Leary, E. M. Roberts, M. Bouare, F. Sissoko, and L. Tapanila. 2006. Malian Paenungulata (Mammalia: Placentalia): New African Afrotheres from the Early Eocene. Journal of Vertebrate Paleontology 26(4):981-988
 M. A. O'Leary, E. M. Roberts, J. J. Head, F. Sissoko, and M. L. Bouare. 2004. Titanosaurian (Dinosauria: Sauropoda) remains from the "Continental Intercalaire" of Mali. Journal of Vertebrate Paleontology 24(4):923-930
 J.-C. Rage. 1983. Palaeophis colossaeus nov. sp. (le plus grand Seprent connu?) de l’Eocène du Mali et le problème du genre chez les Palaeopheinae. Comptes Rendus à l’ Académie des Sciences, Paris, Sciences de la Terre et des Planètes 2(296):1741-1744

Mali
Fossiliferous stratigraphic units
Mali
Fossiliferous stratigraphic units
Fossil